Quentin Persifor Smith (August 27, 1952, Rhinebeck, New York – November 12, 2020, Kalamazoo, Michigan) was an American philosopher.

He was professor emeritus of philosophy at Western Michigan University in Kalamazoo, Michigan. He worked in the philosophy of time, philosophy of language, philosophy of physics and philosophy of religion. 

Smith published over 140 articles. Of his published books, he authored three, co-authored two, and co-authored and edited seven.

He was an editor for Prometheus Books and was the chief editor for Philo from 2001 to 2007. 

He debated William Lane Craig over the existence of God.

Early life and education
Quentin Smith was born in Rhinebeck, New York. His father was a psychology professor at Bennington College and he spent most of his early life in Canada.

He received his bachelor's degree in philosophy from Antioch College, advancing to receive a PhD in philosophy from Boston College.

Career
After college, he received a job as assistant professor of philosophy at the University of Kentucky. Smith found that he could not afford to lose the time he spent teaching, so he resigned from the university to become an independent scholar. 

After accepting a position as a visiting professor at Antioch College, he took a position as professor of philosophy at Western Michigan University in 1993 and retired in 2015.

Death
Smith died on November 12, 2020.

Published works
Epistemology: New Essays (Editor) Oxford: Oxford University Press, 2008. 
Einstein, Relativity and Absolute Simultaneity. (co-edited with William Lane Craig). New York: Routledge, 2007. 
Time, Tense and Reference (co-edited with A. Jokic, and contributing author). Cambridge MA: MIT Press, October 2003. 
Consciousness: New Philosophical Perspectives (co-edited with A. Jokic, and contributing author). Oxford: Oxford University Press, January 2003. 
Ethical and Religious Thought in Analytic Philosophy of Language. New Haven: Yale University Press, 1997. Pp. 264. 
Time, Change and Freedom. (co-authored with L. Nathan Oaklander). New York: Routledge, 1995, pp. 218. 
The New Theory of Time. (co-authored and co-edited with L. Nathan Oaklander). New Haven: Yale University Press, 1994. Pp. 378. 
Theism, Atheism and Big Bang Cosmology. (co-authored with William Lane Craig). Oxford: Oxford University Press, 1993. Pp. 357. 
Language and Time. First Edition. New York. Oxford University Press. 1993. pp. 259. 
The Felt Meanings of the World: A Metaphysics of Feeling. Purdue University Press :West Lafayette, 1986 (Paperback 2010).

See also
American philosophy
List of American philosophers
List of nontheists (philosophy)

References

External links
Official website
Quentin Smith's "Real Atheology" interview on Natural Evils and Immaterial Minds (2017).
Quentin Smith's faculty page for Western Michigan University.
 Quentin Smith's "Closer To Truth" (PBS) interviews with Robert Lawrence Kuhn (2008).
 Quentin Smith's collection of essays at Infidels.org.
 The Sci Phi Show: "Outcast (#26)": "Interview with Dr. Quentin Smith" (00:37:09 minutes long) (2006).
  featuring Quentin Smith, William Lane Craig, Alvin Plantinga, and Richard Gale at California Polytechnic State University (2004).
 Stephen Neale and Jim Holt on the Saul Kripke plagiarism controversy.

1952 births
2020 deaths
20th-century American philosophers
21st-century American philosophers
American atheists
American book editors
Antioch College alumni
Atheist philosophers
American philosophy academics
Morrissey College of Arts & Sciences alumni
People from Rhinebeck, New York
Philosophers from Michigan
Philosophers from New York (state)
Philosophers of language
Philosophers of religion
Philosophy journal editors
Prometheus Books
University of Kentucky faculty
Western Michigan University faculty